Friedrich Albert Moritz Schlick (14 April 1882 – 22 June 1936) was a German philosopher, physicist, and the founding father of logical positivism and the Vienna Circle.

Early life and works
Schlick was born in Berlin to a wealthy Prussian family with deep nationalist and conservative traditions. His father was Ernst Albert Schlick and his mother was Agnes Arndt. At the age of sixteen, he started to read Descartes' Meditations and Schopenhauer's Die beiden Grundprobleme der Ethik. Nietzsche's Also sprach Zarathustra especially impressed him.

He studied physics at the University of Heidelberg, the University of Lausanne, and, ultimately, the University of Berlin under Max Planck. Schlick explained this choice in his autobiography by saying that, despite his love for philosophy, he believed that only mathematical physics could help him obtain actual and exact knowledge. He felt deep distrust towards any metaphysical speculation.

In 1904, he completed his PhD thesis at the University of Berlin under the supervision of Planck. Schlick's thesis was titled Über die Reflexion des Lichts in einer inhomogenen Schicht (On the Reflection of Light in a Non-Homogeneous Medium). After a year as Privatdozent at Göttingen, he turned to the study of philosophy in Zurich. In 1907, he married Blanche Hardy. In 1908, he published Lebensweisheit (The Wisdom of Life), a slim volume about eudaemonism, the theory that happiness results from the pursuit of personal fulfillment as opposed to passing pleasures.

His habilitation thesis at the University of Rostock, Das Wesen der Wahrheit nach der modernen Logik (The Nature of Truth According to Modern Logic), was published in 1910. Several essays about aesthetics followed, whereupon Schlick turned his attention to problems of epistemology, the philosophy of science, and more general questions about science. In this last category, Schlick distinguished himself by publishing a paper in 1915 about Einstein's special theory of relativity, a topic only ten years old. He also published Raum und Zeit in der gegenwärtigen Physik (Space and Time in Contemporary Physics), which extended his earlier results by applying Poincaré's geometric conventionalism to explain Einstein's adoption of a non-Euclidean geometry in the general theory of relativity.

The Vienna Circle and Wittgenstein

After early appointments at Rostock and Kiel, in 1922 Schlick assumed the chair of Naturphilosophie at the University of Vienna which had previously been held by Ludwig Boltzmann and Ernst Mach. Schlick displayed an unusual success in organizing talented individuals in the philosophical and scientific spheres. When Schlick arrived in Vienna, he was invited to lead a group of scientists and philosophers who met regularly (on Thursday evenings in the Chemistry Building) to discuss philosophical topics in the sciences. Early members included the mathematician Hans Hahn and, within a few years, they were joined by Rudolf Carnap, Herbert Feigl, Kurt Gödel, Otto Neurath, Friedrich Waismann, and others. They initially called themselves the Ernst Mach Association, but they eventually became best known as the Vienna Circle. 

In the years 1925–26, the Thursday night group discussed recent work in the foundations of mathematics by Gottlob Frege, Bertrand Russell, and Ludwig Wittgenstein. Wittgenstein's book, Tractatus Logico-Philosophicus, was a work that advanced, among other things, a logical theory of symbolism and a "picture" or "model" theory of language. Schlick and his group were impressed by the work, devoting considerable time to its study and, even when it was no longer the principal focus of their discussion, it was mentioned in discussion. 

Eventually Wittgenstein agreed to meet with Schlick and other Circle members to discuss the Tractatus and other ideas, but he later found it necessary to restrict the visitors to sympathetic interlocutors. Through Schlick's influence, Wittgenstein was encouraged to consider a return to philosophy after some ten years away from the field. Schlick and Waismann's discussions with Wittgenstein continued until the latter felt that germinal ideas had been used without permission in an essay by Carnap, a charge of dubious merit. But he continued discussions in letters to Schlick after he no longer met with other Circle members.

General Theory of Knowledge and later works

Schlick had worked on his Allgemeine Erkenntnislehre (General Theory of Knowledge) between 1918 and 1925, and, though later developments in his philosophy were to make various contentions of his epistemology untenable, the General Theory is perhaps his greatest work in its acute reasoning against synthetic a priori knowledge. This critique of synthetic a priori knowledge argues that the only truths which are self-evident to reason are statements which are true as a matter of definition, such as the statements of formal logic and mathematics. The truth of all other statements must be evaluated with reference to empirical evidence. If a statement is proposed which is not a matter of definition, and not capable of being confirmed or falsified by evidence, that statement is "metaphysical", which is synonymous with "meaningless", or "nonsense". This is the principle upon which members of the Vienna Circle were most clearly in agreement—with each other, as well as with Wittgenstein.

Problems of Ethics
Between 1926  and 1930, Schlick labored to finish Fragen der Ethik (Problems of Ethics), in which he surprised some of his fellow Circlists by including ethics as a viable branch of philosophy. In his 1932–33 contribution to Erkenntnis, "Positivism and Realism", Schlick offered one of the most illuminating definitions of positivism as every view "which denies the possibility of metaphysics" (Schlick [1932–1933], p. 260). Accordingly, he defined metaphysics as the doctrine of "true being", "thing in itself" or "transcendental being", a doctrine which obviously "presupposes that a non-true, lesser or apparent being stands opposed to it"  (Ibid). Therefore, in this work he bases the positivism on a kind of epistemology which holds that the only true beings are givens or constituents of experience. Also during this time, the Vienna Circle published The Scientific View of the World: The Vienna Circle as a homage to Schlick. Its strong anti-metaphysical stance crystallized the viewpoint of the group.

Comment on Wittgenstein's Tractatus
Rudolf Carnap, in his book Logical Syntax of Language, included a comment by Schlick on Wittgenstein's Tractatus.

Death

With the rise of the Nazis in Germany and Austrofascism in Austria, many of the Vienna Circle's members left for the United States and the United Kingdom. Schlick, however, stayed on at the University of Vienna. When visited by Herbert Feigl in 1935, he expressed dismay at events in Germany. On 22 June 1936, Schlick was ascending the steps of the university for a class when he was confronted by a former student, Johann Nelböck, who killed Schlick with a pistol. The court declared Nelböck to be fully compos mentis; he confessed to the act and was detained without any resistance, but was unrepentant.

The killer used the judicial proceedings as a chance to present himself and his ideology in the public. He claimed that Schlick's anti-metaphysical philosophy had "interfered with his moral restraint". In another version of the events, the murderer covered up all political causes and claimed that he was motivated by jealousy over his failed attachment to the female student Sylvia Borowicka, leading to a paranoid delusion about Schlick as his rival and persecutor. 

Nelböck was tried and sentenced, but the event became a distorted cause célèbre around which crystallized the growing nationalist and anti-Jewish sentiments in the city. The fact that Schlick was not Jewish did not seem to matter to propagandists capitalizing on the crime, who associated Schlick with Jewish members of the intelligentsia. After the annexation of Austria into Nazi Germany in 1938, the murderer was released on probation after serving two years of a 10-year sentence.

Legacy
Schlick's enduring contribution to the world of philosophy is as the founder of logical positivism. His humanity, good will, gentleness, and especially his encouragement have been documented by many of his peers. Herbert Feigl and Albert Blumberg, in their introduction to the General Theory of Knowledge, wrote,

Works
 Lebensweisheit. Versuch einer Glückseligkeitslehre. Munich, Becksche Verlagsbuchhandlung 1908
 "Das Wesen der Wahrheit nach der modernen Logik", in: Vierteljahrsschrift für wissenschaftliche Philosophie und Soziologie, Jg. 34, 1910, p. 386–477
 "Die philosophische Bedeutung des Relativitätsprinzips", in: Zeitschrift für Philosophie und philosophische Kritik, 159, 1915, S. 129–175
 Raum und Zeit in der gegenwärtigen Physik. Berlin: Verlag von Julius Springer 1917 (4th ed. 1922)
 Hermann von Helmholtz. Schriften zur Erkenntnistheorie (Publishers: Moritz Schlick & Paul Hertz). Berlin: Springer 1921
 Allgemeine Erkenntnislehre. Berlin: Verlag von Julius Springer 1918 (2nd edition 1925)
 "Kritizistische oder empiristische Deutung der neuen Physik?", in: Kant-Studien, 26, 1921, p. 96–111
 "Einsteins Relativitätstheorie". In: Mosse Almanach, 1921, S. 105–123.
 "Erleben, Erkennen, Metaphysik", in: Kant-Studien, 31, 1926, p. 146–158
 "Vom Sinn des Lebens", in: Symposion. Philosophische Zeitschrift für Forschung und Aussprache, Jg. 1, 1927, p. 331–354
 Fragen der Ethik. Vienna: Verlag von Julius Springer 1930
 "Gibt es ein Materiales Apriori?", 1930
 
 
 "Unanswerable Questions?", 1935
 "Meaning and Verification", 1936
 Gesammelte Aufsätze 1926–1936. Vienna: Gerold & Co. 1938
 Die Probleme der Philosophie in ihrem Zusammenhang. Frankfurt: Suhrkamp Verlag 1986
 Moritz Schlick Gesamtausgabe. Vienna/New York: Springer Verlag 2006. — Almost complete author copy of Vol. I/1, I/2, I/3, I/5, I/6

See also 
 Definitions of philosophy

Notes

References
 Edmonds, David and John Eidinow. Wittgenstein's Poker.  New York:  HarperCollins, 2001.
Fynn Ole Engler, Mathias Iven. Moritz Schlick. Leben, Werk und Wirkung. Berlin: Parerga 2008. 
Schlick, Moritz. Positivism and Realism. Originally appeared in Erkenntnis 111 (1932/33); translated by Peter Heath and reprinted in Moritz Schlick: Philosophical Papers, Volume II (1925–1936) from Vienna Circle Collection, edited by Henk L. Mulder (Kluwer, 1979), pp. 259–284.

Further reading
 
Holt, Jim, "Positive Thinking" (review of Karl Sigmund, Exact Thinking in Demented Times:  The Vienna Circle and the Epic Quest for the Foundations of Science, Basic Books, 449 pp.), The New York Review of Books, vol. LXIV, no. 20 (21 December 2017), pp. 74–76.

External links

 
 Moritz Schlick Research Center at Rostock University

1882 births
1936 deaths
Atheist philosophers
Deaths by firearm in Austria
German atheists
German expatriates in Austria
20th-century German philosophers
20th-century German physicists
Linguistic turn
Logical positivism
People murdered in Austria
Philosophers of science
Vienna Circle
Writers from Berlin
Academic staff of the University of Rostock
German male writers
1936 murders in Austria